Dirty Karma is an indie rock band from Mexico City, Mexico.

The band were formed when in 2005 four childhood friends Mauricio, Gerardo and Rodrigo met one afternoon and discussed the music they listened to. This included classic rock bands such as Led Zeppelin and The Allman Brothers Band to more experimental bands including Radiohead and modern rock band The Strokes. After this they decided to make their own music for fun based on these influences.

During the afternoons they would gather and listen to music and make their own. Eventually the process of making songs began to flow and they began to record an EP. The self titled EP was recorded in TOPETITUD Studios (owned by Paco Ayala and Tito Fuentes of Molotov) was produced with John and Camilo Gibbe Froideval. The EP consisted of 5 songs and was mastered by Chris Geringer (who had worked with Madonna, Molotov and The Dandy Warhols). The songs were well received by Mexican critics.

In 2009 the band were invited to the Vive Latino festival, an annual rock music festival held in Mexico City.

In 2010 they released their debut album Four Elephants, recorded in Tornillo, Texas at Sonic Ranch Studios.

Discography

Albums
Four Elephants - (29 June 2010)

EPs
Dirty Karma - (5 February 2008)

References

External links
Dirty Karma official website

Mexican rock music groups
Mexican indie rock groups
Musical groups established in 2005